Mary Hollis Inboden is an American actress and writer best known for appearing on the TV shows The Real O'Neals, Kevin Can F**k Himself, and The Righteous Gemstones.

Early life
Inboden is a survivor of the 1998 Westside Middle School shooting in Jonesboro, Arkansas, which occurred when she was 12 years old. Her best friend, Paige Herring, was one of the victims killed during the event.

Career
In 2011, Inboden, working with The New Colony theatre company, collaborated on a script based on her experiences as a survivor of a school shooting. The play was named The Warriors and premiered in 2011 in Chicago. A subsequent benefit performance was performed after the Sandy Hook Elementary School shooting.

Inboden began working in television in 2011 appearing in The Chicago Code. In 2016, she was a series regular on The Real O'Neals. The show ran for two seasons before being cancelled in 2017.

In 2019, Inboden appeared as a regular on American Princess.

Inboden was cast as a regular on Kevin Can F**k Himself, which debuted in 2021. Inboden revealed that she was initially reluctant to take the part of Patty, fearing she would be a stereotype, but grew to enjoy the character's arc over the course of the series.

Filmography

References

External links

American shooting survivors
1986 births
Living people
21st-century American actresses
American television actresses